The 2015–16 New Jersey Devils season was the 42nd season for the National Hockey League franchise that was established on June 11, 1974, and 34th season since the franchise relocated from Colorado prior to the 1982–83 NHL season. The team's regular season began on October 9, 2015, against the Winnipeg Jets. The Devils once again missed the playoffs.

Standings

Schedule and results

Pre-season

Regular season

Player statistics
Final stats
Skaters

Goaltenders

†Denotes player spent time with another team before joining the Devils. Stats reflect time with the Devils only.
‡Denotes player was traded mid-season.  Stats reflect time with the Devils only.
Bold/italics denotes franchise record.

Suspensions/fines

Awards and honours

Awards

Milestones

Transactions 
The Devils have been involved in the following transactions during the 2015–16 season.

Trades

Free agents acquired

Free agents lost

Claimed via waivers

Lost via waivers

Players released

Lost via retirement

Player signings

Draft picks

Below are the New Jersey Devils' selections at the 2015 NHL Entry Draft, which was held on June 26–27, 2015, at the BB&T Center in Sunrise, Florida.

Draft notes

 The New Jersey Devils' second-round pick went to the Ottawa Senators as the result of a trade on June 27, 2015 that sent Dallas' second-round pick in 2015 (42nd overall) and a conditional fourth-round pick in 2015 or 2016 to New Jersey in exchange for this pick.
 The Dallas Stars' second-round pick went to the New Jersey Devils as the result of a trade on June 27, 2015 that sent a second-round pick in 2015 (36th overall) to Ottawa in exchange for a conditional fourth-round pick in 2015 or 2016 and this pick.
Ottawa previously acquired this pick as the result of a trade on July 1, 2014 that sent Jason Spezza and Ludwig Karlsson to the Stars in exchange for Alex Chiasson, Nick Paul, Alex Guptill and this pick.
 The New Jersey Devils' fifth-round pick went to the St. Louis Blues as the result of a trade on March 22, 2013 that sent Matt D'Agostini and a seventh-round pick in 2015 to New Jersey in exchange for this pick (being conditional at the time of the trade). The condition – If D'Agostini is not re-signed by New Jersey then St. Louis will receive a fifth-round pick in 2015 – was converted on July 10, 2013.
 The New Jersey Devils' seventh-round pick went the Los Angeles Kings as the result of a trade on June 30, 2013 that sent a seventh-round pick in 2013 to New Jersey in exchange for this pick.

References

New Jersey Devils seasons
New Jersey Devils
New Jersey Devils
New Jersey Devils
New Jersey Devils
21st century in Newark, New Jersey